Cassius is a male saltwater crocodile (Crocodylus porosus) who was previously recognised by the Guinness World Records as the world's largest crocodile in captivity in 2011. Kept at the Marineland Crocodile Park, a zoo on Green Island, Queensland, Australia, Cassius was officially recognized by Guinness in 2011, but lost the title in 2012 to Lolong, a  saltwater crocodile caught in the southern Philippines. Cassius again holds the record since Lolong's death in 2013.

The crocodile, missing the tip of his snout, his left front leg, and the tip of his tail, is named after Cassius Clay, the birth name of boxer Muhammad Ali.

Capture
Cassius was known as a problem animal which attacked boats in the Northern Territory's Finniss River and was captured in 1984. Three years later, he was brought to Green Island by crocodile hunter George Craig, who had opened Marineland Melanesia in 1969. At the time of his introduction at the zoo, Cassius measured .

References

External links
 Marineland Melanesia on Green Island: Cassius the Crocodile

Individual crocodiles
Individual animals in Australia